Ayya may refer to:

 Ayya (Sinhala word), Ayya (අයියා) means elder brother in Sinhala language
 Ayyavazhi, a Tamil/Malayalee Indian religion
 Ayya (2005 Tamil film), a 2005 Tamil language film directed by Hari
 Ayya (2005 Kannada film), a 2005 Kannada film starring Darshan and Rakshitha
 Ayya (Pali word), Ayya, the Pali term, translated as "honourable" or "worthy," commonly used in reference to ordained female Buddhist monks
 Ayyappan, the son of Vishnu ("Ayya") in his Mohini avatar and Shiva ("Appa")
 Vishnu, whose Tamil name is Ayya
 Ayya Vaikunda Avataram (Incarnation of Vaikundar), Hindu festival celebrated by followers of Ayyavazhi on the 20th day of Tamil Month of Masi
 Ayya Vaikundar (1810–1851), Ayya, reference to the deva, Vaikundar, believed to be the incarnation of Trimurthi in Ayyavazhi
 Ayya, Kapurthala, India
 Ayya (river), a river in Perm Krai, Russia